Pimpa or La Pimpa  is an Italian comic strip, created by Francesco Tullio Altan, whose main character is a red-spotted female dog. 

The comic strip was published by the comics magazine Corriere dei Piccoli from 1975 until 1995; from 1987 it also became the leading character of an eponymous monthly children's magazine. Pimpa was also the subject of three animated series, directed by Osvaldo Cavandoli and Enzo D'Alò, produced and broadcast by Rai TV and later released on DVD. In 1998 Pimpa was the main character in two stage plays, Pimpa Cappuccetto Rosso and Pimpa, Kamillo e il libro magico.

References

External links
Official site

Italian comics titles 
Italian comics characters
Comics characters introduced in 1975
Fictional dogs
Comics about dogs
Italian comic strips
Italian children's animated television series
1975 comics debuts
Humor comics
Comics adapted into television series
Comics adapted into animated series